Centra is a convenience shop chain that operates throughout Ireland. The chain operates as a symbol group owned by Musgrave Group, the food wholesaler, meaning the stores are all owned by individual franchisees.

The chain has three different formats available to franchisees — smaller Quick Stop outlets, mid-sized Foodmarkets, and larger Supermarkets. The majority of the stores follow the Quick Stop format, or are simply branded Centra, as Musgrave also offers the SuperValu format, which is geared towards larger supermarkets. 
There are currently approximately 480 Centra stores in the Republic of Ireland and approximately 80 in Northern Ireland. In 2016, Centra posted a 3% increase in sales to €1.59bn. Centra's main competitors are Gala, Spar and Londis, as well as a number of smaller groups such as Costcutter.

History

The chain was originally launched in the Republic of Ireland as "VG" in 1960. In 1979, the VG chain was rebranded SuperValu with the smaller outlets subsequently rebranded as Centra. The company brought both of these stores to Northern Ireland, the latter through the acquisition and subsequent rebranding of Wellworths stores.

Stores

There are over 450 stores. In 2018, plans were announced to open 30 new stores and redevelop 100 others. Centra employs over 11,000 people and serves over three million customers per week.

See also
SuperValu
Musgrave Group
List of Irish companies

References

Retail companies established in 1960
Supermarkets of Northern Ireland
Retail companies of Ireland
Companies of the Republic of Ireland
Irish brands
Convenience stores